Strawberry Shortcake: Pets on Parade is an animated television special from 1982, made by Romeo Muller, Robert L. Rosen, and Fred Wolf. This is the third to feature the American Greetings character, Strawberry Shortcake.

Synopsis
Strawberry Shortcake: Pets on Parade chronicles Strawberryland's "Second Annual Grand Old Petable Pet Show and Pet Parade". Strawberry Shortcake and her cat, Custard, are the judges of the pet show, but the Purple Pieman and Sour Grapes plan to enter their own pets into the show and frame Strawberry for cheating.

Cast

Release
Pets on Parade premiered on April 9, 1982 in 100 U.S. cities. It aired on WCBS in New York City and on KTLA in Los Angeles.

This was the last Strawberry Shortcake special produced by Muller/Rosen.

Reception
In the 1996 edition of Ballantine Books' Video Movie Guide, Mick Martin and Marsha Porter gave the special two and a half stars out of four.

See also
 List of 1980s Strawberry Shortcake television specials

Notes

References

External links
 

1982 television films
1982 films
1982 animated films
1980s American animated films
Animated television specials
Strawberry Shortcake films
First-run syndicated television programs in the United States
American television films
Television shows written by Romeo Muller